In Islam, angels are believed to be heavenly beings, created from a luminous origin by God. Although Muslim authors disagree on the exact nature of angels, they agree that they are autonomous entities with subtle bodies. Yet, both concepts of angels as anthropomorphic creatures with wings and as abstract forces are acknowledged.
 
They have different roles, including their praise of God, interacting with humans in ordinary life, defending against devils (shayāṭīn) and carrying on natural phenomena. Angels are more prominent in Islam compared to Judeo-Christian tradition, being involved in humans everyday life. Belief in angels is one of the main articles of faith in Islam.

The Quran is the principal source for the Islamic concept of angels, but more extensive features of angels appear in hadith literature,  literature, Islamic exegesis, theology, philosophy, and mysticism. The angels differ from other spiritual creatures in their attitude as creatures of virtue, in contrast to devils and jinn. Angels play an important role in Muslim everyday life by protecting the believers from evil influences and recording the deeds of humans.

Islamic Modernist scholars such as Muhammad Asad and Ghulam Ahmed Parwez have suggested a metaphorical reinterpretation of the concept of angels.

Etymology 

Unlike the Hebrew word, however, the term is used exclusively for heavenly spirits of the divine world, as opposed to human messengers. The Quran refers to both angelic and human messengers as  instead.

Characteristics 
In Islam, angels are heavenly creatures created by God. They are considered older than humans and jinn. Contrary to popular belief, angels are never described as agents of revelation in the Quran, although exegesis credits Gabriel with that. 

One of the Islamic major characteristic is their lack of bodily desires; they never get tired, do not eat or drink, and have no anger. As with other monotheistic religions, angels are characterized by their purity and obedience to God. In Islamic traditions, they are described as being created from incorporeal light or fire. A narrative transmitted from Abu Dharr al-Ghifari, audited and commented by two hadith commentary experts in the modern era, Shuaib Al Arna'ut and Muḥammad 'Abd ar-Raḥmān al-Mubarakpuri, has spoken a hadith that Muhammad said the number of angels were countless, to the point that there is no space in the sky as wide as four fingers, unless there is an angel resting his forehead, prostrating to God.

Nobility

Humans and angels 
Muslim scholars have debated whether human or angels rank higher. Angels usually symbolize virtuous behavior, while humans have the ability to sin, but also to repent. The prostration of angels before Adam is often seen as evidence for humans' supremacy over angels. Others hold angels to be superior, as being free from  material deficits, such as anger and lust. Angels are free from such inferior urges and therefore superior, a position especially found among Mu'tazilites and some Asharites. A similar opinion was asserted by Hasan of Basri, who argued that angels are superior to humans and prophets due to their infallibility, originally opposed by both Sunnis and Shias. This view is based on the assumption of superiority of pure spirit against body and flesh. Maturidism generally holds that angels' and prophets' superiority and obedience derive from their virtues and insights to God's action, but not as their original purity.

Contrarily argued, humans rank above angels, since for a human it is harder to be obedient and to worship God, hassling with bodily temptations, in contrast to angels, whose life is much easier and therefore their obedience is rather insignificant. Islam acknowledges a famous story about competing angels and humans in the tale of Harut and Marut, who were tested to determine, whether or not, angels would do better than humans under the same circumstances, a tradition opposed by some scholars, such as ibn Taimiyya, but still accepted by others, such as ibn Hanbal. It seems that humans quality of obedience and temptations mirrors that of angels: In the Quran, Adam fell from God's favor for his wish to be like the angels, while a pair of angel is said to have fallen for their desire for human lust. In a comment of Tafsir al-Baydawi it is said that the angels' "obedience is their nature while their disobedience is a burden, while human beings' obedience is a burden and their hankering after lust is their nature.

Andalusian scholar ibn Arabi argues that a human generally ranks below angels, but developed to Al-Insān al-Kāmil, ranks above them. This reflects the major opinion that prophets and messengers among humans rank above angels, but the ordinary human below an angel, while the messengers among angels rank higher than prophets and messengers among humans. Ibn Arabi elaborates his ranking in  based on a report by Tirmidhi. Acordingly, Muhammad intercedes for the angels first, then for (other) prophets, saints, believers, animals, plants and inanimate objects last, this explaining the hierarchy of beings in general Muslim thought.

Groups of modern scholars from Imam Mohammad Ibn Saud Islamic University in Yemen and Mauritania issued  that the angels should be invoked with blessing Islamic honorifics, which is applied to human prophets and messengers. This fatwas were based on the ruling from Ibn Qayyim al-Jawziyya.

Impeccability 

The possibility and degree of erring angels is debated in Islam. Hasan of Basra (d. 728) is often considered one of the first who asserted the doctrine of angelic infallibility. Others accepted the possibility of fallible angels, such as Abu Hanifa (d. 767), who ranked angels based on their examples in the Quran.

The Quran describes angels in al-Tahrim (66:6) "not disobeying" and in al-Anbiya "not acting arrogant", which served as a base for the doctrine of angelic impeccability. Others argue that, if angels couldn't sin, it wouldn't be necessary to compliment them for their obedience. Similarly al-Anbiya (21:29) stresses out that if an angel were to claim divinity for himself, he would be sentenced to hell, implying that angels might commit such a sin. This verse is generally associated with Iblis (Satan), those nature (angel, jinn, or devil) is likewise up to debate. The presense of two fallen angels referred to as Harut and Marut, further hindered their complete absolution from potentially sinning. 

To defend the doctrine of angelic impeccability, al-Basra already reinterpreted these verses and argued that Harut and Marut were human kings but not angels. Likewise, he was a strong advocate for rejecting Iblis' angelic origin. His approach is by no means universally accepted among Muslim scholars. Al-Maturidi (853–944 CE) pointed at verses of the Quran, according to which angels are tested by God and concludes angels have free-will, but, due to their insights to God's nature, choose to obey. Some angels nevertheless lack this insight and fail. Al-Baydawi asserts that "certain angels are not infallible even if infallibility is prevalent among them — just as certain human beings are infallible but fallibility is prevalent among them." Al-Taftazani (1322 AD –1390 AD) agrees with al-Basri that angels wouldn't become unbelievers, such as Iblis did, but accepted they might slip into error and become disobedient, like Harut and Marut. Most scholars of Salafism reject accounts on erring angels entirely and do not investigate this matter further.

Purity 
Angels believed to be engaged in human affairs are closely related to Islamic purity and modesty rituals. Many hadiths, including Muwatta Imam Malik from one of the Kutub al-Sittah, talk about angels being repelled by humans' state of impurity. Such angels keep a distance from humans, who polluted themselves by certain actions (such as sexual intercourse). However, angels might return to an individual as soon as the person (ritually) purified themselves. The absence of angels may cause several problems for the person. If driven away by ritual impurity, the Kiraman Katibin, who record people's actions, and the Guardian angel, will not perform their tasks assigned to the individual. Another hadith specifies, during the state of impurity, bad actions are still written down, but good actions are not. When a person tells a lie, angels nearby are separated from the person from the stench the lie emanates. Angels also depart from humans when they are naked or are having a bath out of decency, but also curse people who are nude in public.

Some scholars assert that such circumstances might interfere with an angels' work and thus impede their duty. For example, dogs, unclean places, or something confusing them might prevent them from entering a home.

In philosophy 
Inspired by Neoplatonism, the medieval Muslim philosopher Al-Farabi developed a cosmological hierarchy, governed by several Intellects. For al-Farabi, human nature is composed of both material and spiritual qualities. The spiritual part of a human exchanges information with the angelic entities, who are defined by their nature as knowledge absorbed by the Godhead. A similar function is attested in the cosmology of the Muslim philosopher Ibn Sina, who, however, never uses the term angels throughout his works. For Ibn Sina, the Intellects have probably been a necessity without any religious connotation.

Muslim theologians, such as al-Suyuti, rejected the philosophical depiction on angels, based on hadiths stating that the angels have been created through the light of God. Thus angels would have substance and could not merely be an intellectual entity as claimed by philosophers.

The chain of being, according to Muslim thinkers, includes minerals, plants, animals, human and angels. Muslim philosophers usually define angels as substances endowed with reason and immortality. Humans and animals are mortal, but only men have reason. Devils are unreasonable like animals, but immortal like angels.

Sufism 

Unlike  (theology), Sufi cosmology usually makes no distinction between angels and jinn, understanding the term  as "everything hidden from the human senses". Ibn Arabi states: "[when I refer to] jinn in the absolute sense of the term, [I include] those which are made of light and those which are made of fire." While most earlier Sufis (like Hasan al-Basri) advised their disciples to imitate the angels, Ibn-Arabi advised them to surpass the angels. The angels being merely a reflection of the Divine Names in accordance within the spiritual realm, humans experience the Names of God manifested both in the spiritual and in the material world.

Just as in non-Sufi-related traditions, angels are thought of as created of light. Al-Jili specifies that the angels are created from the Light of Muhammad and in his attribute of guidance, light and beauty. Influenced by Ibn Arabi's Sufi metaphysics, Haydar Amuli identifies angels as created to represent different names/attributes of God's beauty, while the devils are created in accordance with God's attributes of Majesty, such as "The Haugthy" or "The Domineering".

The Sufi Muslim and philosopher Al Ghazali (–19 December 1111) divides human nature into four domains, each representing another type of creature: animals, beasts, devils and angels. Traits human share with bodily creatures are the animal, which exists to regulate ingestion and procreation and the beasts, used for predatory actions like hunting.

Angels as companions 
In later Sufism, angels are not merely models for the mystic but also their companions. Humans, in a state between earth and heaven, seek angels as guidance to reach the upper realms. Some authors have suggested that some individual angels in the microcosmos represent specific human faculties on a macrocosmic level. According to a common belief, if a Sufi can not find a sheikh to teach him, he will be taught by the angel Khidr. The presence of an angel depends on human's obedience to divine law. Dirt, depraved morality and desecration may ward off an angel.

Angels and devils 
According to al-Ghazali, humans consist of animalistic and spiritual traits. From the spiritual realm, the plane in which symbols take on form, angels and devils advise the human hearth. However, the angels also inhabit the realm beyond considered the realm from which reason derives from and devils have no place.

While the angels endow the human mind with reason, advices virtues and leads to worshipping God, the devil perverts the mind and tempts to abusing the spiritual nature by committing sins, such as lying, betrayal, and deceit. The angelic natures advices how to use the animalistic body properly, while the devil perverts it. Humans are potentially both angels and devils, depending on whether the sensual soul or the rational soul develop.

In Salafism 
Contemporary Salafism continues to regard the belief in angels as a pillar of Islam and regards the rejection of the literal belief in angels as unbelief and an innovation brought by secularism and Positivism. Modern reinterpretations, as for example suggested by Nasr Abu Zayd, are strongly disregarded. Simultaneously, many traditional materials regarding angels are rejected on the ground, they would not be authentic. The Muslim Brotherhood scholars Sayyid Qutb and Umar Sulaiman Al-Ashqar reject much established material concerning angels, such as the story of Harut and Marut or naming the Angel of Death Azrail. Sulayman Ashqar not only rejects the traditional material itself, he furthermore disapproves of scholars who use them.

Classification of angels 
Islam has no standard hierarchical organization that parallels the division into different "choirs" or spheres hypothesized and drafted by early medieval Christian theologians, but generally distinguishes between the angels in heaven fully absorbed in the ma'rifa (knowledge) of God and the messengers (rasūl) who carry out divine decrees between heaven and earth. Others add a third group of angels, and categorize angels into İlliyyûn Mukarrebûn (those around God's throne), Mudabbirât (carrying the laws of nature), and Rasūl (messengers). Since angels are not equal in status and are consequently delegated to different tasks to perform, some authors of tafsir (mufassirūn) divided angels into different categories:

Al-Baydawi records that Muslim scholars divide angels in at least two groups: those who are self-immersed in knowledge of "the Truth" (al-Haqq), based on "they laud night and day, they never wane" (21:29), they are the "highmost" and "angels brought near" and those who are the executors of commands, based on "they do not disobey Allah in what He commanded them but they do what they are commanded" (66:6), who are the administers of the command of heaven to earth.

Fakhr al-Din al-Razi (d. 1209) divided the angels into eight groups, which shows some resemblance to Christian angelology:
 Muqarrabun (Cherubim), who surround the throne of God, constantly praising God (tasbīḥ)
 Archangels, such as Jibrāʾīl, Mīkhāʾīl, Isrāfīl, and ʿAzrāʾīl
 Angels of Paradise, such as Riḍwān.
 Angels of Hell, Mālik and Zabānīya
 Guardian angels, who are assigned to individuals to protect them
 The angels who record the actions of people
 Angels entrusted with the affairs of the world, like the angel of thunder.

Angels in Islamic art 
 Angels in Islamic art often appear in illustrated manuscripts of Muhammad's life. Other common depictions of angels in Islamic art include angels with Adam and Eve in the garden of Eden, angels discerning the saved from the damned on the Day of Judgement, and angels as a repeating motif in borders or textiles. Islamic depictions of angels resemble winged Christian angels, although Islamic angels are typically shown with multicolored wings. Angels, such as the archangel Gabriel, are typically depicted as masculine, which is consistent with God's rejection of feminine depictions of angels in several verses of Quran. Nevertheless, later depictions of angels in Islamic art are more feminine and androgynous.

The 13th century book Ajā'ib al-makhlūqāt wa gharā'ib al-mawjūdāt (The Wonders of Creation) by Zakariya al-Qazwini describes Islamic angelology, and is often illustrated with many images of angels. The angels are typically depicted with bright, vivid colors, giving them unusual liveliness and other-worldly translucence. While some angels are referred to as "Guardians of the Kingdom of God," others are associated with hell. An undated manuscript of The Wonders of Creation from the Bavarian State Library in Munich includes depictions of angels both alone and alongside humans and animals. Angels are also illustrated in Timurid and Ottoman manuscripts, such as The Timurid Book of the Prophet Muhammad’s Ascension and the Siyer-i Nebi.

List of angels

Archangels 
There are four special angels considered to rank above the other angels in Islam. They have proper names, and central tasks are associated with them:
Jibrīl is the angel who communicated with all of the prophets and also descended with the blessings of God during the night of Laylat al-Qadr ("The Night of Divine Destiny (Fate)"). Jibrīl is further acknowledged as a magnificent warrior in Islamic tradition, who led an army of angels into the Battle of Badr and fought against Iblis, when he tempted ʿĪsā (Jesus).
 Mīkāl/Mīkāʾīl/Mīkhāʾīl(English: Michael), the archangel of mercy, is often depicted as providing nourishment for bodies and souls while also being responsible for bringing rain and thunder to Earth. Some scholars have pointed out that Mikail is in charge of angels who carry the laws of nature.
 Isrāfīl (frequently associated with the Jewish and Christian angel Raphael), is the archangel who blows into the trumpet in the end time, therefore also associated with music in some traditions. Israfil is responsible for signaling the coming of Qiyamah (Judgment Day) by blowing a horn. However,  (a student of Muhammad Nasiruddin al-Albani), Muhammad ibn al-Uthaymeen, and Al-Suyuti, have given commentary that all the hadiths that describe Israfil as the horn-blower are classified as Da'if, although given the multitude of narrative chains that support this concept, they state that it is still possible.
 ʿAzrāʾīl/ʿIzrāʾīl(English: Azrael), is the archangel of death. He and his subordinative angels are responsible for parting the soul from the body of the dead and will carry the believers to heaven and the unbelievers to hell.

Mentioned in the Quran 

 Nāziʿāt and Nāshiṭāt, helpers of Azrail who take the souls of the deceased.
Nāziʿāt: they are responsible for taking out the souls of disbelievers painfully.
Nāshiṭāt: they are responsible for taking out the souls of believers peacefully.
 Hafaza, (the Guardian angel):
 Kiraman Katibin (Honourable Recorders), two of whom are charged to every human being; one writes down good deeds and another one writes down evil deeds. They are both described as 'Raqeebun 'Ateed' in the Qur'an.
 Mu'aqqibat (the Protectors) who keep people from death until its decreed time and who bring down blessings.

 Angels of Hell:
 Mālik, chief of the angels who govern Jahannam (Hell).
 Nineteen angels of hell, commanding the Zabaniyah, to torment sinful people in hell. The nineteen angel chiefs of hell were depicted in Quran chapter Al-Muddaththir verse . The Saudi Arabia religious ministry released their official interpretation that Zabaniyah were collective names of angels group which included those nineteen chief angels. Those nineteen angels of hell were standing tall above Saqar, one of levels in hell. Muhammad Sulaiman al-Asqar, professor from Islamic University of Madinah argued the nineteen instead were nineteen type of hell angels which each type has different kind of form.
 Angels who distribute provisions, rain, and other blessings by God's command.
 Ra'd or angels of thunders, a name of angels group who drive the clouds. The angels who regulating the clouds and rains in their task given by God were mentioned in  Ibn Taymiyyah in his work, Majmu al-Fatwa al-Kubra, has quoted the Marfu hadith transmitted by Ali ibn abi Thalib, that Ra'd were the name of group of angels who herded the dark clouds like a shepherd. Ali further narrated that thunder was the growling voices of those angels while herding the clouds, while lightning strikes were a flaming device used by the said angel in gathering and herding the raining clouds. Al-Suyuti narrated from the hadith transmitted from Ibn Abbas about the lightning angels, while giving further commentary that hot light produced by lightning were the emitted light produced from a whip device used by those angels. Saudi Grand Mufti Abd al-Aziz Bin Baz also ruled on the  practice of reciting Sura Ar-Ra'd, Ayah 13  whenever a Muslim hears the sound of thunder, as this was practiced according to the hadith tradition narrated by Zubayr ibn al-Awwam. The non-canonical interpretation from Salaf generation scholars regarding the tradition from Ali has described that "It is a movement of celestial clouds due to air compression in the cloud. However, this does not contradict that (the metaphysical explanation), […] the angels move the clouds from one place to another. Indeed, every movement in the upper and lower World results from the action of the angels. The voice of a person results from the movement of his body parts, which are his lips, his tongue, his teeth, his epiglottis, and his throat; he, however, along with that, is said to be praising his Lord, enjoining good, and forbidding evil." 
 Harut and Marut, often depicted as fallen angels who taught the humans in Babylon magic; mentioned in Quran (2:102). Some early scholars, such as Hasan al-Basri, and especially Salafi scholars, rejected the notion that Harut and Marut were fallen angels.

Mentioned in canonical hadith tradition 
 The angels of the Seven Heavens.
 Jundullah, those who helped Muhammad in the battlefield.
 Those that give the spirit to the fetus in the womb and are charged with four commands: to write down his provision, his life-span, his actions, and whether he will be wretched or happy.
Malakul Jibaal (The Angel of the Mountains), met by the Prophet after his ordeal at Taif.
 Munkar and Nakir, who question the dead in their graves.

Hadith narratives of Isra and Mi'raj 

According to hadith transmitted by Ibn Abbas, Muhammad encountered several significant angels on his journey through the celestial spheres. Many scholars such as Al-Tha'labi drew their exegesis upon this narrative, but it never led to an established angelology as known in Christianity.

Mentioned in non canonical tradition 
 Ridwan, the keeper of Paradise.
 Artiya'il, the angel who removes grief and depression from the children of Adam.
 Habib, an angel Muhammad met during his night journey composed of ice and fire.
 The angels charged with each existent thing, maintaining order and warding off corruption. Their exact number is known only to God.
 Darda'il (The Journeyers), who travel the earth searching out assemblies where people remember God's name.

Disputed 
 Dhul-Qarnayn, believed by some to be an angel or "part-angel" based on the statement of Umar bin Khattab.
 Khidr, sometimes regarded as an angel which took human form and thus able to reveal hidden knowledge exceeding those of the prophets to guide and help people or prophets.
 Azazil, in many early reports a former archangel, who was among those who were commanded to bow before Adam, but he refused to and was banished to hell.

See also 

 Angels in art
 Angels in Judaism
 List of theological angels
 List of theological demons
 Nuriel
 Peri

Notes

References 

 
Angels